Olamide Aladejobi Patrick Alexander Faison ( (born July 21, 1983) is an American actor and singer.

Career 
He plays Miles Robinson on the children's television show Sesame Street. Born in New York City, Faison joined the cast in 2003. He is the third actor to play the role, after Miles Orman and Imani Patterson.

Faison is the lead singer and the guitarist for the Universal/Motown group Imajin. He spends much of his time between tapings of Sesame Street, practicing in the halls of the Kaufman Astoria Studios, where the show is shot. In 2010, Faison contributed background vocals on the song "Skybourne" from Currensy's 2010 album Pilot Talk.

Personal life 
Olamidé is the youngest brother of Donald Faison, who is best known for Juice, Clueless and its 1996 television teen sitcom and Scrubs.  His name is of Yoruba origin, meaning "my wealth has come."

References

External links 

Olamide Faison And Natalie Nunn

1983 births
Living people
American male television actors
Imajin members
Male actors from New York City
American people of Yoruba descent
American people of Nigerian descent
Musicians from New York City
African-American male actors
21st-century American male actors
21st-century American musicians
Yoruba male actors
Yoruba musicians
21st-century African-American musicians
20th-century African-American people